I nostri mariti is a 1966 Italian comedy film directed by Luigi Filippo D'Amico, Dino Risi and Luigi Zampa.

Cast
 Alberto Sordi - Giovanni Lo Verso (segment "Il marito di Roberta")
 Ugo Tognazzi - Carabiniere (segment "Il Marito di Attilia ovvero nei Secoli Fedeli")
 Jean-Claude Brialy - Ottavio (segment "Il Marito di Olga")
 Michèle Mercier - Olga (segment "Il Marito di Olga")
 Akim Tamiroff - Cesare (segment "Il Marito di Olga")
 Lando Buzzanca - Ragionier Malanzin (segment "Il Marito di Olga")
 Nicoletta Machiavelli - Roberta (segment "Il marito di Roberta")
 Liana Orfei - Attilia (segment "Il Marito di Attilia ovvero nei Secoli Fedeli")
 Elena Nicolai - Giovanni's mother-in-law (segment "Il marito di Roberta")
 Claudio Gora - The Doctor (segment "Il marito di Roberta")

References

External links

1966 films
1966 comedy films
Italian comedy films
1960s Italian-language films
Italian anthology films
Italian black-and-white films
Films directed by Luigi Zampa
Films directed by Dino Risi
Films set in Rome
Films directed by Luigi Filippo D'Amico
Films with screenplays by Age & Scarpelli
1960s Italian films